Introducing the Kujus is a 2020 Nigerian comedy-drama film directed by Biodun Stephen and produced by Winifred Okpapi. The film stars Bisola Aiyeola, who co-produced the film. It also features Timini Egbuson, Femi Jacobs, Bimbo Ademoye, Sophie Alakija and Mimi Onalaja and is set in Badagry. The movie focuses on one young woman's love for her family, and how this love reunites her family and ends old feuds. It was released on 27 November 2020. In its opening week, the film grossed ₦10 million. Introducing the Kujus is suitable for family viewing but parental guidance is advised.

Plot 
Introducing the Kujus tells the story of five Nigerian siblings who are at crossroads. They do not want to return to their hometown in Badagry for the five-year remembrance of their mother's death. Mausi Kuju (played by Bisola Aiyeola) with the help of Maugbe Kuju (played by Timini Egbuson) orchestrates a plan to bring their other siblings together. For the plan to succeed, she must trick her siblings, but the volatile nature of their relationship means she does not know how exactly it'll go.

Cast 
 Bisola Aiyeola as Mausi
 Timini Egbuson as Maugbe
 Femi Jacobs as Mautin
 Kunle Remi as Mauyan
 Ronke Odusanya as Maupe
 Bimbo Ademoye as Ebi
 MC Lively  as Barry Wonder
 Sophie Alakija as Lily
 Folaremi Agunbiade as Chuks
 Mimi Onalaja as Pamela
 Chris Iheuwa as Otunba
 Temitope Ogunleye as Tombra
 Ayomide Ogunleye as Bibiana

Awards and nominations

References 

Nigerian comedy-drama films
2020 films
Yoruba-language films
2020s English-language films
Films set in Lagos
English-language Nigerian films